Lyces minuta is a moth of the Notodontidae family  first described by Herbert Druce in 1885. It is endemic to eastern Ecuador. It is recognizable by abdominal markings; a lateral orange stripe and a dorsal transverse orange band on A1.

References

External links
Species page at Tree of Life Web Project

Notodontidae
Moths described in 1885